Joyce is an unincorporated community and census-designated place in Winn Parish, Louisiana, United States. Its population was 384 as of the 2010 census. Its ZIP code is 71440.

Demographics

Notes

Unincorporated communities in Winn Parish, Louisiana
Unincorporated communities in Louisiana
Census-designated places in Winn Parish, Louisiana
Census-designated places in Louisiana
Populated places in Ark-La-Tex